Olegario Vázquez Aldir (born April 28, 1972, Mexico City) is a Mexican businessman and the director general of Grupo Empresarial Ángeles. With an estimated private net worth of 6.4 billion dollars as of 2023.

Life
Vázquez Aldir was born to Olegario Vázquez Raña, the founder of GEA, and María de los Ángeles Aldir. He received an undergraduate degree in business administration from the Universidad Iberoamericana and a master's degree in healthcare administration from Boston University in the United States.

He was named director general of GEA in 2000. With an estimated net worth of 6.4 billion dollars. Under his management, GEA has grown in size by acquiring Grupo Imagen, Excélsior and cadenatres in the media sector, as well as the 2014 acquisition of Querétaro FC, a top-flight Mexican soccer club.

References

1972 births
Living people
Businesspeople from Mexico City
Boston University alumni
Universidad Iberoamericana alumni
People named in the Pandora Papers